Mary Ellen Pinkham is a humor columnist and author in the United States. One of her books topped The New York Times Best Seller list for more than a year.

Bibliography
It Works!: Over 1,000 New Uses for Common Household Items, 2004
Mary Ellen's Clean House!: the All-In-One-Place Encyclopedia of Contemporary Housekeeping, 1993
Mary Ellen's Best of Helpful Hints, 1979
Mary Ellen's One Thousand New Helpful Hints, 1983
Mary Ellen's Giant Book of Helpful Hints

References

Year of birth missing (living people)
21st-century American writers
Living people